Lilienthal is a German and Jewish surname. Notable people with the surname include:

 Alfred Lilienthal, American author
 Andor Lilienthal, Hungarian chess player
 David E. Lilienthal, (1899–1981) American public official at TVA and Atomic Energy Commission
 Gustav Lilienthal, German aviation pioneer, brother of Otto
 Max Lilienthal, Early Reform Rabbi
 Otto Lilienthal, German aviation pioneer, brother of Gustav
 Peter Lilienthal, film director
 Philip H. Lilienthal, American lawyer, camp director, and philanthropist
 Philip N. Lilienthal (1850–1908). American banker 

German-language surnames